Equihash is a memory-hard Proof-of-work algorithm introduced by the University of Luxembourg's Interdisciplinary Centre for Security, Reliability and Trust (SnT) at the 2016 Network and Distributed System Security Symposium. The algorithm is based on a generalization of the Birthday problem which finds colliding hash values. It has severe time-space trade-offs but concedes vulnerability to unforeseen parallel optimizations. It was designed such that parallel implementations are bottle-necked by memory bandwidth in an attempt to worsen the cost-performance trade-offs of designing custom ASIC implementations. ASIC resistance in Equihash is based on the assumption that commercially-sold hardware already has quite high memory bandwidth, so improvements made by custom hardware may not be worth the development cost.

General
Equihash was proposed by Alex Biryukov and Dmitry Khovratovich as part of the University of Luxembourg research group CryptoLUX. It was introduced at the Network and Distributed System Security Symposium 2016 in San Diego. Notable blockchain-based projects such as ZCash, BitcoinZ, Horizen, Aion, Hush, and Pirate Chain have integrated Equihash for reasons such as security, privacy, and ASIC miner resistance.

The manufacturer Bitmain has succeeded in optimizing the processing of Zcash's Equihash-200,9 with an ASIC.

Specification 

The problem in Equihash is to find distinct, -bit values  to satisfy  such that  has  leading zeros, where  is a chosen hash function. In addition, there are "algorithm binding conditions" which are intended to reduce the risk of other algorithms developed to solve the underlying birthday problem being applicable. A memory-less verification requires hashes and XORs.

Memory-hardness and time-space tradeoffs 
It is proposed that the puzzle in Equihash be solved by a variation of Wagner's algorithm for the generalized birthday problem. (Note that the underlying problem is not exactly the Generalized Birthday Problem as defined by Wagner, since it uses a single list rather than multiple lists.) The proposed algorithm makes  iterations over a large list. Alcock and Ren
refute Equihash’s security claims, concluding that no tradeoff-resistance bound is in fact known for Equihash.

Usage 

See also
Proof of stake

References

Cryptocurrencies
Cryptographic algorithms